George Reinblatt (born 1977) is a Canadian playwright, television writer, and comedy writer from Toronto, Ontario. He is best known for writing for the Comedy Central Roasts, and for the hit off-Broadway stage show Evil Dead The Musical.

Evil Dead the Musical
 Evil Dead the Musical - book & lyrics, music

Reviews

Evil Dead The Musical has had overwhelmingly positive reviews.

 The New York Times has called it "The Next Rocky Horror Show".
 Entertainment Weekly called it "The show is as funny as it is gory" 
 The Hollywood Reporter called it  "Silly, fun, loosely campy and not terrifying at all"
 And Variety (magazine) said  "Evil Dead: The Musical” should be a disaster.... It has self-aware jokes, ironically earnest songs and a tacit assertion that the creators think their entire project is a goof. And yet it works. The show's wit, gore and stage magic make it a ridiculous amount of fun."

References

External links
official website

1977 births
Living people
Canadian comedy writers
Canadian humorists
Canadian television writers
Writers from Toronto